William Hare (14 May 1935 – 15 January 2005) was a Canadian sports shooter. He competed at the 1964, 1968 and 1972 Summer Olympics.

References

1935 births
2005 deaths
Canadian male sport shooters
Olympic shooters of Canada
Shooters at the 1964 Summer Olympics
Shooters at the 1968 Summer Olympics
Shooters at the 1972 Summer Olympics
Sportspeople from Ottawa
Shooters at the 1974 British Commonwealth Games
Commonwealth Games medallists in shooting
Commonwealth Games gold medallists for Canada
Pan American Games medalists in shooting
Pan American Games silver medalists for Canada
Shooters at the 1963 Pan American Games
20th-century Canadian people
21st-century Canadian people
Medallists at the 1974 British Commonwealth Games